Janusz Lewandowski (March 10, 1931, Warsaw–August 13, 2013) was a Polish diplomat, known for arranging the Operation Marigold, a failed secret attempt to reach a compromise solution to the Vietnam War.

In 1955 he graduated from Taras Shevchenko National University of Kyiv, then Ukrainian SSR and afterwards held various positions at the Polish foreign ministry.

At the time when he started arranging  the Vietnam talks, officially he was a representative at the International Control Commission set up to monitor the ceasefire in the divided Vietnam.

Later he served as an ambassador to a number of countries and retired in 1991.

Lewandowski died of cancer in 2013 and interred at the Powązki Military Cemetery.

Awards
Order of Polonia Restituta, Knight's Cross, Poland
Order of Polonia Restituta, Officer's Cross, Poland
Order of Prince Henry, Portugal
 Order of Sukhbaatar, Mongolian People's Republic

References

1931 births
2013 deaths
Diplomats from Warsaw
People from Warsaw Voivodeship (1919–1939)
Polish diplomats
People of the Vietnam War
Burials at Powązki Military Cemetery
Ambassadors of Poland to Cyprus
Ambassadors of Poland to Greece